Willard High School is a public high school in Willard, Ohio, United States.  It is the only high school in the Willard City School District.  Their nickname is the Crimson Flashes. A long time member of the Northern Ohio League (1944-2017), Willard joined the Sandusky Bay Conference in 2017.

Notable alumni

 Red Davis, NFL player
 Charlie Frye, NFL Quarterback
 Vern Ehlers, U.S. Representative for Michigan's 3rd district

References

External links
 District Website

High schools in Huron County, Ohio
Public high schools in Ohio